Atagi Dam is a gravity dam located in Gifu Prefecture in Japan. The dam is used for flood control. The catchment area of the dam is 16 km2. The dam impounds about 14  ha of land when full and can store 2550 thousand cubic meters of water. The construction of the dam was started on 1973 and completed in 1987.

References

Dams in Gifu Prefecture
1987 establishments in Japan